The 1990 FIVB Women's World Championship was the eleventh edition of the tournament, organised by the world's governing body, the FIVB. It was held from 22 August to 1 September 1990 in Beijing, Shanghai, and Shenyang, PR China.

Teams

Group A – Beijing
 
 
 
 

Group B – Shanghai
 
 
 
 

Group C – Shanghai
 
 
 
 

Group D – Shenyang

Squads

Results

First round

Pool A
Location: Beijing

|}

|}

Pool B
Location: Shanghai

|}

|}

Pool C
Location: Shanghai

|}

|}

Pool D
Location: Shenyang

|}

|}

Final round

Play-offs for quarterfinals
Location: Shenyang

|}

Group head matches
Location: Beijing

|}

13th–16th places
Location: Shanghai

|}

|}

9th–12th places

9th–12th semifinals

|}

11th place match

|}

9th place match

|}

Finals

Quarterfinals

|}

5th–8th semifinals

|}

Semifinals

|}

7th place match

|}

5th place match

|}

3rd place match

|}

Final

|}

Final standing

Awards

 Most Valuable Player
  Irina Parkhomchuk
 Best Attacker
  Ana Moser
 Best Receiver
  Sonia Ayaucán

 Best Server
  Li Guojun
 Best Setter
  Fernanda Venturini
 Best Blocker
  Kimberly Oden

External links
 Results
 Federation Internationale de Volleyball
 Peru Info

FIVB Volleyball Women's World Championship
FIVB Volleyball
FIVB Volleyball 1990
1990
World Championship
FIVB Volleyball
FIVB Volleyball
FIVB Volleyball